Rampur Maniharan Assembly constituency is one of the 403 constituencies of the Uttar Pradesh Legislative Assembly, India. It is a part of the Saharanpur district and one of the five assembly constituencies in the Saharanpur Lok Sabha constituency. First assembly election in this assembly constituency was conducted in 2012 after the constituency came into existence in the year 2008 as a result of the "Delimitation of Parliamentary and Assembly Constituencies Order, 2008".

Wards / Areas
Extent of Rampur Maniharan Assembly is Nagal, Rampur & Rampur Maniharan NP of Deoband tehsil; Landhora Gujjar, Chandena, Kankar Kooi, Sabdalpur Shivdaspur, Chhid Bana, Kapasa, Lakhnaur, Dabki Junnardar, Hasanpur Bhalaswa, Nalheda Gujjar, Sahajwa, Beetiya, Malhipur, Chunehti Gada, Mubarakpur & Sheikhpura Kadeem of Saharanpur district.

Members of the Legislative Assembly

Election Results

2022

2017

17th Vidhan Sabha: 2017 Assembly Elections

2012

16th Vidhan Sabha: 2012 Assembly Elections

See also

Saharanpur district
Saharanpur Lok Sabha constituency
Government of Uttar Pradesh
List of Vidhan Sabha constituencies of Uttar Pradesh
Uttar Pradesh
Uttar Pradesh Legislative Assembly

References

External links
 

Assembly constituencies of Uttar Pradesh
Politics of Saharanpur district
Constituencies established in 2008
2008 establishments in Uttar Pradesh